Haciendo Historia (Making History) is Xtreme's second album. The album contains the singles "Shorty, Shorty" and "¿Adónde Se Fue?". The album has sold 18,000 copies as of February 2007. On November 20, 2007, the Platinum Edition was released with an additional four tracks. There were two different versions of the smash hit "Shorty Shorty", a fully English version and a fully Spanish version which was just referenced as a Pop version. The other two tracks were new songs in which one of them featured Adrienne Bailon. It was a two disc album. The first disc was a CD and the second one a DVD.

Track listing

Charts

Weekly charts

Year-end charts

Sales and certifications

References

2006 albums
Xtreme (group) albums